William Bardolf may refer to:

William Bardolf (leader) (died  1275), English baron
William Bardolf, 4th Baron Bardolf (1349–1386), English landowner
William Phelip, 6th Baron Bardolf (died 1441), English member of the Royal Household